Suzhou North America High School (SNA) is an American curriculum international school in Wuzhong District, Suzhou, China.

North Carolina State University and the Suzhou Wuzhong Group cofounded the school, which was scheduled to open in September 2013. The school accepts Chinese citizens and non-Chinese citizens.

References

External links
 Suzhou North America High School
 
 Suzhou North America High School 
 SNA: Connecting to the Future at Weebly

High schools in Suzhou
International schools in Suzhou
American international schools in China
North Carolina State University
Educational institutions established in 2013
2013 establishments in China